Ioannis Giannoulis may refer to:
Ioannis Giannoulis (swimmer), member of the 2008 Greek Olympic team
Giannis Giannoulis, professional basketball player